In five-dimensional geometry, a rectified 5-orthoplex is a convex uniform 5-polytope, being a rectification of the regular 5-orthoplex.

There are 5 degrees of rectifications for any 5-polytope, the zeroth here being the 5-orthoplex itself, and the 4th and last being the 5-cube. Vertices of the rectified 5-orthoplex are located at the edge-centers of the 5-orthoplex. Vertices of the birectified 5-orthoplex are located in the triangular face centers of the 5-orthoplex.

Rectified 5-orthoplex

Its 40 vertices represent the root vectors of the simple Lie group D5. The vertices can be seen in 3 hyperplanes, with the 10 vertices rectified 5-cells cells on opposite sides, and 20 vertices of a runcinated 5-cell passing through the center. When combined with the 10 vertices of the 5-orthoplex, these vertices represent the 50 root vectors of the B5 and C5 simple Lie groups.

E. L. Elte identified it in 1912 as a semiregular polytope, identifying it as Cr51 as a first rectification of a 5-dimensional cross polytope.

Alternate names
 rectified pentacross
 rectified triacontiditeron (32-faceted 5-polytope)

Construction 

There are two Coxeter groups associated with the rectified pentacross, one with the C5 or [4,3,3,3] Coxeter group, and a lower symmetry with two copies of 16-cell facets, alternating, with the D5 or [32,1,1] Coxeter group.

Cartesian coordinates 
Cartesian coordinates for the vertices of a rectified pentacross, centered at the origin, edge length  are all permutations of:
 (±1,±1,0,0,0)

Images

Related polytopes 

The rectified 5-orthoplex is the vertex figure for the 5-demicube honeycomb:
 or 

This polytope is one of 31 uniform 5-polytope generated from the regular 5-cube or 5-orthoplex.

Notes

References 
 H.S.M. Coxeter:
 H.S.M. Coxeter, Regular Polytopes, 3rd Edition, Dover New York, 1973
 Kaleidoscopes: Selected Writings of H.S.M. Coxeter, edited by F. Arthur Sherk, Peter McMullen, Anthony C. Thompson, Asia Ivic Weiss, Wiley-Interscience Publication, 1995,  
 (Paper 22) H.S.M. Coxeter, Regular and Semi Regular Polytopes I, [Math. Zeit. 46 (1940) 380-407, MR 2,10]
 (Paper 23) H.S.M. Coxeter, Regular and Semi-Regular Polytopes II, [Math. Zeit. 188 (1985) 559-591]
 (Paper 24) H.S.M. Coxeter, Regular and Semi-Regular Polytopes III, [Math. Zeit. 200 (1988) 3-45]
 Norman Johnson Uniform Polytopes, Manuscript (1991)
 N.W. Johnson: The Theory of Uniform Polytopes and Honeycombs, Ph.D.
  o3x3o3o4o - rat

External links 
 Polytopes of Various Dimensions
 Multi-dimensional Glossary

5-polytopes